Jordan Terrell Carter (born September 13, 1996), known professionally as Playboi Carti, is an American rapper. Carter was initially signed to local underground label Awful Records prior to signing with ASAP Mob's AWGE Label under Interscope Records. After gaining a cult following early in his career, Carter garnered mainstream attention in 2017.

Carter's debut mixtape was released in April 2017, and included the Billboard Hot 100 charting singles "Magnolia" and "Woke Up Like This" (featuring Lil Uzi Vert). His debut studio album Die Lit (2018) peaked at number 3 on the US Billboard 200. Following a two-year hiatus with little-to-no new music released, Carter's highly anticipated second album, Whole Lotta Red (2020), debuted at number one on the Billboard 200 and became his first chart-topping release.

Aside from his solo career, Carter established his Opium record label in 2019 which has since signed artists such as Ken Carson and Destroy Lonely.

Early life
Jordan Terrell Carter was born in Atlanta and grew up in the nearby suburb Riverdale, Georgia. In a 2016 interview with Complex, he stated, "My ma couldn't tell me shit. Nobody could tell me shit." This type of lifestyle influenced Carter to get into trouble as a youth and sway away from the idea of pursuing a higher level of education after high school. He attended North Springs Charter High School in Sandy Springs. 

Before rap, Carter wanted to become an NBA star to try and make something of himself. In an interview with The Fader, he said, "I was a young AI and didn't go to practice. That was the time I was really ducking school and it was all hoop and no rap. I would smoke before practice, get on the court and drop 30." He stopped playing basketball after a disagreement with his coach. He then dedicated his time to music. 

Carter skipped high school classes regularly to work on his music or go to his job at H&M, which led to Carti barely graduating high school. In an interview with The Fader, he said, "I was in class with freshmen finishing work, and if I finished the nine assignments before this time I could graduate." He was so close to not graduating that no one showed up to his graduation, because they didn't know it was actually going to take place.

Carter developed a unique fashion sense from an early age, shopping in thrift stores. He told Vogue that he was teased for being an early adopter of new styles, such as colored skinny jeans.

Career

2011–2016: Beginnings
Carti began rapping at an early age under the name Sir Cartier in 2011. He changed it to Playboi Carti in 2013. He began uploading songs on SoundCloud in 2011. In 2014, after meeting producer Ethereal, he joined Awful Records. Carti credits Ethereal with helping him find his sound. Once Carti chose to pursue music full-time, he made the decision to move to New York City with some family. 

While in New York City, Carti stayed at his drug dealer's house, and members of ASAP Mob frequented the house. Carti ran into ASAP Bari, who introduced him to ASAP Rocky. Carti decided to go to Texas with ASAP Rocky. He began to attract attention in 2015 with his singles "Broke Boi" and "Fetti" featuring Da$h and Maxo Kream, both of which were published to SoundCloud. 

Around this time, Carti frequently collaborated with artists in Atlanta's underground rap scene, including UnoTheActivist, Thouxanbanfauni, Yung Bans, Lil Yachty, Ethereal, and producers MexikoDro, and ICYTWAT. He began to tour with ASAP Ferg and Lil Uzi Vert, and he signed a deal with Interscope Records.

In 2016, he was featured on the A$AP Mob's single "Telephone Calls" from their album Cozy Tapes Vol. 1: Friends. The same year, Carti signed to the A$AP Mob's AWGE imprint.

2017–2018: Playboi Carti and Die Lit
Carti released his eponymous debut mixtape in April 2017. The release gained attention from various music publications, including XXL, Pitchfork, Spin, HotNewHipHop, and PopMatters, and reached No. 12 on the Billboard 200. The mixtape spawned two successful singles: "Magnolia", which reached number 29 on the Billboard Hot 100, and "wokeuplikethis*" featuring Lil Uzi Vert, which reached number 76. 

Accompanying the mixtape's release, Carti embarked on a tour with Gucci Mane and Dreezy. In June 2017, Playboi Carti was named as one of the ten of XXLs "2017 Freshman Class". Around this time, he was featured on A$AP Mob's single "Raf" from their album Cozy Tapes Vol. 2: Too Cozy and Lana Del Rey's single "Summer Bummer" from her album Lust for Life.

In May 2018, Carti released his debut full-length album Die Lit, which peaked at number 3 on the US Billboard 200. Months later, in August 2018, Carti announced his second studio album Whole Lotta Red.

2019–present: Whole Lotta Red and Music
Carti began work on his second album Whole Lotta Red late in 2018. Over the next two years, many of Carti's songs were leaked onto the internet and accumulated tens of millions of streams. He did not release any original music, instead being featured on numerous singles, including "Baguettes in the Face" featuring NAV and A Boogie wit da Hoodie from DJ Mustard's album and "Earfquake" by Tyler the Creator. In April 2020, Carti released his first new music since 2018 with the song "@ Meh", which peaked at number 35 on the Hot 100. 

The following month, he was featured on the single "Pain 1993" by Drake, which debuted at number 7 on the Billboard Hot 100 and became Carti's first top-ten on the chart. In November 2020, Carti announced that Whole Lotta Red was complete and had been submitted to his label. On Thanksgiving Day, 2020, Carti was featured on Lil Yachty's deluxe album Lil Boat 3.5 on the song "Flex Up" with Future. The following month, hip-hop commentator DJ Akademiks announced that Whole Lotta Red was scheduled for a Christmas Day release. Carter confirmed the Christmas release date on December 21, 2020. On December 25, 2020, Carti released the 24-track long album Whole Lotta Red. 

It debuted at number one on the US Billboard 200, becoming Carti's first chart-topping release. In June 2021, Carti was featured on rapper Lil 1 DTE's single, "Homixide" from his self-titled mixtape. 
 In August 2021, Playboi Carti was featured on the songs "Off the Grid", "Junya", and "Junya, Pt. 2" in Kanye West's album Donda.

On December 25, 2022, Carti came back to Twitter after over a year, making tweets, like "Hello    Twitter", and "love all my supporters  it's time", possibly hinting at another Christmas Day release alike to his second studio album, Whole Lotta Red in 2020.

On February 21, 2023, Atlanta DJ Swamp Izzo talked about Carter's next album in an interview, stating: "Playboi Carti album is done". And that it would be getting released in the Summer.

On March 3, 2023, Playboi Carti started day 1 of Rolling Loud California. During the set he performed "Rockstar" an unreleased track off Music.

Fashion and modeling
Carter's fashion style is one of the main features of his public image. He has called himself a "thrift store kid" and often prefers vintage garments. GQ has defined Carter as the "leader of a youth style", and said that he represents a stylistic midpoint between the "fashion gloss of A$AP Mob, the punk-rock attitude of Uzi Vert, and the playful camp of Yachty."

Carter's favorite designer label is Balmain and his favorite designer is Raf Simons, whom he met at a 2017 fashion show in New York City. Carter is featured on the song "RAF" by A$AP Mob, which was dedicated to Raf Simons. The music video for the song included Carter, A$AP Rocky, and Quavo wearing rare Raf Simons-designed clothing. In 2017, Carter told Vogue that he considers Kanye West and A$AP Rocky his fashion inspirations.

Carter has modeled numerous times, including Louis Vuitton at Paris Fashion Week, Kanye West's Yeezy Season 5, VFiles, and Drake's OVO Lookbook alongside Ian Connor and John Ross.

Musical style

Carter has been described as a "mumble rapper", and his music as "playful, hard-hitting, and very melodic." Complex called his style of rapping "spare and repetitive, more concerned with flow and catchy phrases." Briana Younger at Pitchfork said that "Carti's music is less about lyricism and more about atmosphere", going on to say that "whatever Carti lacks in substance he makes up in sheer audacity."

Carter is known for his "baby voice" technique, characterized by his voice hitting high pitches with unclear pronunciations and frantic cadences. He has used this technique on popular songs such as "Almeda" with Solange, "Earfquake" with Tyler, the Creator, and "Pissy Pamper" with Young Nudy and Pi'erre Bourne.

The New York Times said Carti's rapping made it appear as if he was "more at ease with the performance of the role than with the actual act of rapping."

He uses Satanic imagery. His style is influenced by vampire movies. Lil Wayne inspired him to freestyle all of his raps.

He is influenced by A$AP Rocky, Kanye West, Jay-Z, MF DOOM, Slayer, Sex Pistols and  Kiss.

Carter is known for his rock star persona and lyrical focus on sex and drugs.

Personal life 
In 2017, he briefly dated American model Blac Chyna. In 2018, Carter was romantically involved with Rubi Rose, a model and rapper who rose to fame after appearing in the music video for "Bad and Boujee" by Migos. He allegedly shot a gun at Rose after she hid his phones before a flight. They broke up after Carter cheated on her with Blac Chyna. 

Later in 2018, Carter began dating Australian rapper Iggy Azalea, whom he met while he was overseas on tour. In December 2018, they moved in together in the Buckhead neighborhood of Atlanta. In 2020, Azalea gave birth to Carter's son. They split in December 2019. In December 2020, Azalea revealed Carter had cheated on her and missed her son's birth. Carter refused to sign their son's birth certificate.

As of June 2019, Carter is living and working in and around the Atlanta area after relocating from Los Angeles.

Carter has asthma.

Legal issues 
Carter punched a driver in Gretna, Scotland during his concert tour in February 2018. He was fined £800 after a trial.

In April 2020, Carter was arrested on gun and drug-related charges in Clayton County, Georgia. After Carter was stopped by police for having an expired tag on his Lamborghini, authorities found 12 bags of marijuana, three guns, Xanax, codeine and oxycodone. After an altercation between Carter and the police, he and another man named Jaylon Tucker, were arrested and taken to Clayton County jail. Carter was charged for expired tags, possession of marijuana and improperly passing an emergency vehicle. The following morning Carter was released on bond.

It was reported on February 14, 2023, that Carter was arrested on December 29, 2022, on a felony assault charge after allegedly choking his girlfriend, who was 14 weeks pregnant. Carter was released on bond a day after his arrest.

Opium

Opium, sometimes stylized in all-caps, is an American record label founded in 2019 by Playboi Carti.

Notable artists signed to Opium include American rappers Ken Carson and Destroy Lonely, who are both concurrently signed to Interscope Records.

Roster

Current

Discography

Studio albums 
 Die Lit (2018)
 Whole Lotta Red (2020)
 TBA (2023)

Tours

Headlining

 Playboi Carti Tour (2017)
 Die Lit Tour (2018)
 Neon Tour (2018)
 King Vamp/Narcissist Tour (2021–2022)
 Rolling Loud (2023)
 Wireless Festival (2023)

Supporting

 ASAP Rocky – Injured Generation Tour (2019)
 Wiz Khalifa – Decent Exposure Summer Tour (2019)

Awards and nominations

BET Hip Hop Awards

|-
| rowspan="2" | 2017
| Himself
| Best New Hip-Hop Artist
| 
|-
| Playboi Carti
| Best Mixtape
| 
|-

Grammy Awards 

|-
| 2022
| Donda (Kanye West, as featured artist and songwriter)
| Album of the Year
| 
|-

iHeartRadio Music Awards

|-
| 2018
| Himself
| Best New Hip-Hop Artist
| 
|-

References

External links
 Official website

1996 births
Living people
21st-century African-American male singers
21st-century American rappers
African-American male models
African-American male rappers
African-American male singer-songwriters
Bloods
Experimental musicians
Interscope Records artists
Mumble rappers
People from Fairburn, Georgia
People from Riverdale, Georgia
People from Sandy Springs, Georgia
Rappers from Atlanta
Rappers from Georgia (U.S. state)
Southern hip hop musicians
Trap musicians
Trap metal musicians